Meaghan Mikkelson (born January 4, 1985) is a Canadian ice hockey player and a member of the Canadian national ice hockey team, currently affiliated with the Calgary chapter of the Professional Women's Hockey Players Association (PWHPA). Mikkelson won gold medals during the 2010 and 2014 Winter Olympics and silver at the 2018 Winter Olympics. She was selected third overall in the 2011 CWHL Draft by Team Alberta CWHL, nicknamed the Alberta Honeybadgers and later renamed the Calgary Inferno. Prior to her Canadian Women's Hockey League (CWHL) career, Mikkelson played with the Edmonton Chimos of the Western Women's Hockey League (WWHL).

Playing career
Mikkelson grew up in St. Albert, Alberta, and represented Team Alberta at the 2003 Canada Winter Games in Bathurst and Campbellton, New Brunswick, as the Alberta team finished in seventh position.

Wisconsin Badgers
In 2007, she tied for 11th in the NCAA with 42 points in 34 games and tied for sixth with 32 assists. Among defencemen, she was second in the country during the regular season with 1.24 points per game and ninth overall with .94 assists per game. During the 2006–07 NCAA season, she was part of the Wisconsin defence that allowed a nation's best 0.94 goals per game and 15 shutouts, a school record. In the WCHA, she led all defencemen with 33 points in 28 league games and was fifth overall. Mikkelson tied for second in the league with 24 assists.

Hockey Canada
Named to 2014 Olympic roster for Canada. She made her Team Canada debut with the National Women's Team at the 2007 Fall Festival. Mikkelson appeared in her first IIHF World Women's Championship in 2008. In the gold medal game of the 2010 Four Nations Cup, Meaghan Mikkelson had a goal and an assist for Canada. With 1:49 left in the third period, Mikkelson scored to tie the game and force overtime.
 In a game versus Russia at the 2012 IIHF Women's World Championship, Mikkelson registered three assists in a 14–1 victory.

CWHL
Appearing with the Calgary Inferno in the 2016 Clarkson Cup finals, Mikkelson registered one assist as the Inferno emerged victorious in a convincing 8-3 final. Mikkelson was one of two captains for Team Blue in the 3rd CWHL All-Star Game, the first time that one team in the CWHL All-Star Game had two captains.

Amazing Race Canada - Season 2
In the ice hockey skills challenge Detour "Puck It" combined with partner Natalie Spooner, to shoot 4 from 4 on the 1 through 4 "hole" targets, then 1 from 53 attempting to hit the final five-hole target.
At the end of the show, after arriving in first place for seven times in a total of eleven legs, the golden girls got the official second place of the competition, losing to the best buddies, Mickey and Pete. After the race, the girls won a year of free gas from Petro-Canada for being voted the fan favourite team from the season.

Awards and honours
2007, All-WCHA defenceman
2007, All-WCHA First Team
2007, WCHA Defensive Player of the Year
2007, Top 10 candidate for the 2007 Patty Kazmaier Award
Directorate Award, Best Defender, 2011 IIHF Women's World Championship
Media All-Star team, 2011 IIHF Women's World Championship

Personal life
Her father, Bill Mikkelson, played four seasons in the NHL in the early 1970s with Los Angeles, the New York Islanders and Washington. Her brother, Brendan, was a Memorial Cup champion with the WHL's Vancouver Giants, a second round pick, 31st overall, in the 2005 NHL Entry Draft, played five seasons in the NHL and now plays for the Cardiff Devils in the Elite Ice Hockey League (EIHL).

In June 2011, Mikkelson married minor league goaltender Scott Reid. The couple met in 2007 when they worked together at a hockey school in Edmonton. Their son was born in September 2015 in Calgary. At the time of her gold medal win at the 2010 Vancouver Winter Games, Reid played for the Alaska Aces. He has also played for the Arizona Sundogs.

She participated in various festivities commemorating the 2012 NHL All-Star Game in Ottawa, Ontario. Said festivities included attendance at Rideau Hall for the NHL Hockey is for Everyone event, interviews at the Sirius XM Stage (along with a fan question and answer period) at the Scotiabank NHL Fan Fair. In addition, she participated in the Energizer Night Skate at the Ottawa Rink of Dreams (relocated from the Rideau Canal), and attended the Molson Canadian NHL All-Star Skills Competition on Saturday, January 28.

Her great uncle, Jimmy McFadden, won the Calder Memorial Trophy in 1948, and the Stanley Cup in 1950. 

In June 2014, Mikkelson and her teammate Natalie Spooner appeared as contestants in the second season of The Amazing Race Canada. They finished the race in 2nd place.

References

External links

 
 
 
 
 

1985 births
Living people
Calgary Inferno players
Canadian women's ice hockey defencemen
Canadian people of Danish descent
Clarkson Cup champions
Edmonton Chimos players
Sportspeople from Regina, Saskatchewan
Sportspeople from St. Albert, Alberta
Ice hockey players at the 2010 Winter Olympics
Ice hockey players at the 2014 Winter Olympics
Ice hockey players at the 2018 Winter Olympics
Medalists at the 2010 Winter Olympics
Medalists at the 2014 Winter Olympics
Medalists at the 2018 Winter Olympics
Olympic gold medalists for Canada
Olympic silver medalists for Canada
Olympic ice hockey players of Canada
Olympic medalists in ice hockey
Wisconsin Badgers women's ice hockey players
Ice hockey people from Alberta
Ice hockey people from Saskatchewan
Canadian expatriate ice hockey players in the United States
Canadian expatriate ice hockey players in Sweden
Professional Women's Hockey Players Association players
The Amazing Race Canada contestants
Luleå HF/MSSK players